Antonios Aronis (born 17 March 1957) is a Greek former water polo player who competed in the 1980 Summer Olympics, in the 1984 Summer Olympics, and in the 1988 Summer Olympics. He played for Greek powerhouses Ethnikos Piraeus and Olympiacos Piraeus. He won 14 trophies (11 championships) with Ethnikos and 4 (2 championships) with Olympiacos.

Honours

With Ethnikos OFPF 

 Greek Championship: 1976, 1977, 1978, 1979, 1980, 1981, 1982, 1983, 1984, 1985, 1988
 Greek Cup: 1984, 1985, 1988
 LEN Champions League 4th place: 1980

With Olympiacos SFP 

 Greek Championship: 1992, 1993
 Greek Cup: 1992, 1993

See also
 Greece men's Olympic water polo team records and statistics
 List of men's Olympic water polo tournament top goalscorers

References

External links
 

1957 births
Living people
Greek male water polo players
Olympiacos Water Polo Club players
Olympic water polo players of Greece
Water polo players at the 1980 Summer Olympics
Water polo players at the 1984 Summer Olympics
Water polo players at the 1988 Summer Olympics
Place of birth missing (living people)

Ethnikos Piraeus Water Polo Club players
Water polo players from Piraeus